The 2022–23 Biathlon World Cup (BWC) was a multi-race series over a season of biathlon, organised by the International Biathlon Union. The season started on 29 November 2022 in Kontiolahti, Finland and ended on 19 March 2023 in Oslo Holmenkollen, Norway.

Quentin Fillon Maillet from France and Marte Olsbu Røiseland from Norway were the defending overall champions from the 2021–22 season.

Map of world cup hosts  
All 10 locations hosting world cup events in this season (including Oberhof – venue of the World Championships).

 World Championships

Calendar

Men

Calendar

Relay – 4 x 7.5 km

Standings

Overall

Under 25

Individual

Sprint

Pursuit

Mass start

Relay

Nations Cup

Women

Calendar

Relay – 4 x 6 km

Standings

Overall

Under 25

Individual

Sprint

Pursuit

Mass start

Relay

Nations Cup

Mixed Relay

Rankings

Podium table by nation 
Table showing the World Cup podium places (gold–1st place, silver–2nd place, bronze–3rd place) by the countries represented by the athletes.

Points distribution 
The table shows the number of points won in the 2022–23 Biathlon World Cup for men and women. Relay events do not impact individual rankings.

Achievements 
First World Cup career victory 

Men

Women
 Anna Magnusson (27), in her 9th season – Stage 3 Sprint in Annecy-Le Grand-Bornand

First World Cup podium 

Men
   Niklas Hartweg (22), in his 3rd season – Stage 1 Individual in Kontiolahti – 2nd place
 Tommaso Giacomel (22), in his 4th season – Stage 8 Individual in Östersund – 2nd place
 David Zobel (26), in his 3rd season – Stage 1 Individual in Kontiolahti – 3rd place
 Éric Perrot (21), in his 3rd season – Stage 8 Mass Start in Östersund – 3rd place

Women
 Anna Magnusson (27), in her 9th season – Stage 3 Sprint in Annecy-Le Grand-Bornand – 1st place
 Lou Jeanmonnot (24), in her 3rd season – Stage 5 Individual in Ruhpolding – 2nd place
 Chloé Chevalier (27), in her 7th season – Stage 6 Sprint in Antholz-Anterselva – 2nd place

Team
Mixed
  – no. 3 in Stage 4 Single Mixed Relay in Pokljuka
  – no. 3 in Stage 7 Single Mixed Relay in Nové Město

Number of wins this season (in brackets are all-time wins) 

Men

 Johannes Thingnes Bø – 16 (68)
 Sturla Holm Lægreid – 1 (10)
 Vetle Sjåstad Christiansen – 1 (4)
 Benedikt Doll – 1 (4)
 Johannes Dale – 1 (2)
 Martin Ponsiluoma – 1 (2)

Women

 Dorothea Wierer – 3 (16)
 Denise Herrmann-Wick – 3 (11)
 Elvira Öberg – 3 (7)
 Julia Simon – 3 (7)
 Marte Olsbu Røiseland – 2 (17)
 Hanna Öberg – 2 (8)
 Lisa Theresa Hauser – 2 (5)
 Lisa Vittozzi – 1 (3)
 Anna Magnusson – 1 (1)

Retirements 
The following notable biathletes retired during or after the 2022–23 season:

Men
 Jules Burnotte
 Serafin Wiestner
 Miha Dovžan

Women
 Mari Eder
 Nastassia Kinnunen
 Anaïs Chevalier-Bouchet
 Denise Herrmann-Wick 
 Vanessa Hinz
 Federica Sanfilippo
 Asuka Hachisuka
 Fuyuko Tachizaki
 Tiril Eckhoff
 Marte Olsbu Røiseland 
 Magdalena Gwizdoń
 Ekaterina Yurlova-Percht
 Valentyna Semerenko

See also 
2022–23 Biathlon IBU Cup

Notes

References

External links 

 IBU official site

 
Biathlon World Cup
World Cup
World Cup